Ediriweera Weerawardena, is a Sri Lankan politician and former Member of Parliament. He served as a Deputy Minister in the Central Government for some time, later withdrew from national politics and entered provincial council politics.

Political career
In 2000, he was appointed as the Deputy Minister of Development, Rehabilitation and Reconstruction of the East and Rural Housing Development under Kumaratunga cabinet. In 2014, he assumed the duties as the Central Provincial Minister of Road Development, Transport, Power, Energy, Housing and Construction. In June 2016, Weerawardena was appointed as the acting Chief Minister in Central Province. In 2019, he was appointed as the New seat organizer for Harispattuwa seat in Kandy district. In 2021 under the presidency of Maithripala Sirisena, he was appointed as one of the 10 Vice Presidents of The Sri Lanka Freedom Party's (SLFP) Executive Committee.

References

Living people
1951 births
Members of the 10th Parliament of Sri Lanka
Sri Lanka Freedom Party politicians
United People's Freedom Alliance politicians